Mark Morgenstern is a Canadian director, cinematographer and editor from Montreal, Quebec.

Filmography (partial)
 Refuge (2008), a documentary on rebels in Darfur by Alexandre Trudeau, as editor
 Je fonds en comble (2008) as co-director and cinematographer
 Remembrance (2001) as cinematographer
 Shooter (2000) as director 
 Curtains (1995) as co-director (with his sister Stephanie Morgenstern) and cinematographer

External links

Ewola Cinéma site

Living people
Film directors from Montreal
Canadian cinematographers
Canadian film editors
Place of birth missing (living people)
Year of birth missing (living people)
Canadian Film Centre alumni